Deskjet is a brand name for inkjet printers manufactured by Hewlett-Packard. These printers range from small domestic to large industrial models, although the largest models in the range have generally been dubbed DesignJet. The Macintosh-compatible equivalent was branded as the Deskwriter and competed with Apple's StyleWriter, and the all-in-one equivalent is called OfficeJet.

History
HP began making inkjet printers with the HP Thinkjet (models HP 2225A and HP 2225B) in 1984. In 1988, HP introduced the first DeskJet. It included a built-in cut sheet feeder, 2 ppm, and 300 dpi. This was followed by the DeskJet Plus in 1989. It offered a landscape printing ability. The DeskJet 500 was introduced in 1990, offering a faster printing speed of 3 ppm. Meanwhile, HP introduced the DeskWriter for the Macintosh in 1989, based on the DeskJet 500.

By 1987, the world's first full-color inkjet printer, the PaintJet, was introduced. It was so successful that HP introduced a version of the DeskJet capable of color printing, the DeskJet 500C, in October 1991, which is also HP's first 300 dpi color printer, offering 4 minutes per page in color, using a swappable either black or CMY print head cartridge. It was replaced by the DeskJet 550C in October 1992, HP's first dual-cartridge color DeskJet, offering a real black instead of mixed black ink in color prints, using both the 500C's cartridges at once. The DeskJet 560C followed in March 1994, which introduced HP ColorSmart to intelligently analyze documents for the best color output.

Meanwhile, HP introduced the DeskJet Portable (3 ppm) in 1992. It was designed to be easily portable. It was targeted at mobile professionals. It was replaced by the HP DeskJet 310 (4 ppm B&W, 4 minutes per page color) in 1993, the HP DeskJet 320 in 1994, the HP DeskJet 340 (2 minutes per page color) in 1995, and the HP DeskJet 350 and 350CBi (5 ppm B&W, 2 ppm color) in 2000.

HP continued to make black-and-white-only inkjet printers with the HP DeskJet 510 (1992) and 520 (1994). The HP DeskJet 520 introduced resolution enhancement technology, or REt, to HP inkjet printers. It was also HP's last black-and-white-only inkjet printer. The HP DeskJet 500, 510, 520, 500C, 550C, and 560C were all replaced by the HP DeskJet 540 (3 ppm B&W, 1.5 minutes per page color). A one-pen inkjet printer, color was optional. Also it introduced a different industrial design.

HP's high-end printer line started with the HP DeskJet 1200C, introduced in 1993, offering 6 ppm B&W, and 1 ppm color. This was replaced by the HP DeskJet 1600C (1995), offering 9 ppm B&W, and 4 ppm color, which offered a successor, the HP DeskJet 1600CN (1996), the 1600C with built-in networking.

HP replaced the PaintJet XL300 and the DeskJet 1600C/1600CN with the HP DeskJet 1000C/1100C/1120C in 1998, HP's first A3 inkjet printers under the DeskJet brand. These printers were replaced by the HP DeskJet 1220C in 2000, offering 12 ppm in B&W, and 10 ppm in color.

Vivid, enduring HP Vivera inks were introduced with the HP Deskjet 6540 in 2004, offering breakthrough printing speeds of up to 30 ppm in black-and-white, and 20 ppm in color.

HP all-in-one inkjet printers under the Deskjet brand exist, starting with the HP Deskjet F380 printer/scanner/copier, introduced in 2006, using HP Vivera inks, and offering print speeds of 20 ppm in black-and-white, and 14 ppm in color.

Today, HP sells various Deskjets. The current line of HP Deskjets include the HP Deskjet 1000/2000/3000, and all-in-ones like the 1050/1055/2050/3050/3050A/3510/3520. The 1000, 1050, and 1055 were introduced in 2010, while the 2000/3000/2050/3050/3050A/3510/3520 were introduced in September 2011. The 3050/3050A/3510/3520 include touchscreen LCDs. Many current HP Deskjets offer print speeds of 20 ppm B&W and 14 ppm color.

See also
 List of Hewlett-Packard products

References

External links
 HP Deskjet Marks 20 Years as World’s Best-selling Printer

Deskjet
Products introduced in 1988